Valenus inornatus is a species of longhorn beetles of the subfamily Lamiinae, and the only species in the genus Valenus. It was described by Casey in 1892.

References

Acanthocinini
Beetles described in 1892
Monotypic beetle genera